John Holmes (born June 20, 1953) is a former American football fullback in the National Football League who played for the New Orleans Saints. He played college football for the Texas Southern Tigers. He also played in the USFL for the Oakland Invaders.

References

1953 births
Living people
American football fullbacks
New Orleans Saints players
Oakland Invaders players
Texas Southern Tigers football players